Caze, Cazé, or Cazê may refer to:

People
 Amélie Cazé (b. 1985), French modern pentathlete
 Christophe Caze (1969–1996), French criminal and terrorist
 Genevieve LaCaze (b. 1989), Australian athlete
 Joey LaCaze (1971–2013), American drummer
 Louis La Caze (1798–1869), French physician and collector of paintings
 Robert La Caze (b. 1917), French-born Moroccan racing driver
 Carlos José de Araújo Peccini (b. 1968), Brazilian television host who uses the stage name Cazé Peçanha

Places
Cazê, a township in Tibet

See also 
 Cazes (disambiguation)
 La Caze (disambiguation)